A farmhouse is a rural house. The word may also refer to:
 FarmHouse, a social fraternity
 Farmhouse (album), by Phish
 Farmhouse (band), a group of well-known Australian TV actors
 Farmhouse (film), 2008 film directed by George Bessudo

See also 
 Farm House (disambiguation)